Saber Eid Ali Omar (born 1 May 1959) is an Egyptian football midfielder who played for Egypt in the 1990 FIFA World Cup. He also played for Ghazl El Mahalla.

References

External links
FIFA profile

1959 births
Egyptian footballers
Egypt international footballers
Association football midfielders
1990 FIFA World Cup players
Living people
People from El Mahalla El Kubra